McDermitt may refer to:

Josh McDermitt (born 1978), American actor and comedian
McDermitt, Nevada and Oregon, unincorporated community in the United States
McDermitt State Airport, airport in Oregon